In enzymology, a D-pinitol dehydrogenase is an enzyme that catalyzes the chemical reaction

1D-3-O-methyl-chiro-inositol + NADP+  2D-5-O-methyl-2,3,5/4,6-pentahydroxycyclohexanone + NADPH + H+

Thus, the two substrates of this enzyme are 1D-3-O-methyl-chiro-inositol and NADP+, whereas its 3 products are 2D-5-O-methyl-2,3,5/4,6-pentahydroxycyclohexanone, NADPH, and H+.

This enzyme belongs to the family of oxidoreductases, specifically those acting on the CH-OH group of donor with NAD+ or NADP+ as acceptor. The systematic name of this enzyme class is 1D-3-O-methyl-chiro-inositol:NADP+ oxidoreductase. This enzyme is also called 5D-5-O-methyl-chiro-inositol:NADP+ oxidoreductase.

References 

 

EC 1.1.1
NADPH-dependent enzymes
Enzymes of unknown structure